Lorenzo Grossi (born 25 March 1998) is an Italian professional footballer who plays as a midfielder for Serie D club Nuova Florida Calcio.

Club career
Born in Rome, Grossi was formed in A.S. Roma youth sector.

On 5 October 2020, he joined Serie B club Pro Vercelli. Grossi was loaned to Gozzano for the 2018–19 Serie C season, and made his professional debut on 17 August 2018 against Virtus Entella.

On 5 October 2020, he joined Serie C club Fermana. On 31 January 2022, his contract was terminated by mutual consent.

On 31 January 2022, he signed with Serie D club Nuova Florida Calcio.

International career
Grossi was a youth international for Italy.

References

External links
 
 

1998 births
Living people
Footballers from Rome
Italian footballers
Association football midfielders
Serie C players
F.C. Pro Vercelli 1892 players
A.C. Gozzano players
Fermana F.C. players
Italy youth international footballers